A ridge is a long, narrow elevation of the land surface.

Ridge may also refer to:

Ridge in a field, which divides troughs in ridge and furrow agriculture
Ridge (roof), an architectural element on roofs
Ridge (surname)

Places

India
 The Ridge, Shimla, open space in Himachal Pradesh, India

United Kingdom
 Ridge, Dorset, a village in Dorset, England
 Ridge, Hertfordshire, a village in Hertfordshire, England
 Ridge, Wiltshire

United States
 Ridge, Lafayette Parish, Louisiana
 Ridge, Maryland
 Ridge, New York, a location on Long Island
 Ridge Township, Shelby County, Illinois
 West Ridge, Chicago, Illinois
 Ridge (CTA station), former railway station in Chicago
 Ridge, Robertson County, Texas
 Ridge, West Virginia

Arts, entertainment, and media

Characters
 Ridge (comics), a character from Marvel Comics
 Ridge Forrester, a fictional character in the CBS soap opera The Bold and the Beautiful

Games
 Ridge Racer, an arcade game

Television
 Sophy Ridge on Sunday, a Sky News Sunday morning talk show fronted by Sophy Ridge

Mathematics
 Ridge (differential geometry), curves of locally maximal curvature on surfaces in 3D
 Ridge (geometry), an (n-2)-dimensional element of a polytope
 Ridge regression, a statistical regularization method
 Ridge function, a multivariate function that decomposes into a projection and a univariate function

Science
 Ridge (biology), a domain of the genome with a high gene expression
 Ridge (meteorology), an elongated region of relatively high atmospheric pressure
 Ridge detection, an image descriptor for capturing elongated objects that are brighter than their surrounding
 RIDGE (Radar Integrated Display with Geospatial Elements), in which weather radar images are projected on a map

Other uses
 Ridge, a term used in dog breeding, meaning a ridge of hair that runs along the back in the opposite direction from the rest of the coat, e.g. on the Thai Ridgeback
 Ridge Vineyards, a wine producer in the Santa Cruz Mountains of California
 Ridge Cloud, a cloud provider offering a computing platform for users who want to run workloads with Kubernetes-based architectures in various locations

See also
 The Ridge (disambiguation)
 Ridge Township (disambiguation)
 Ridge, Texas (disambiguation)
 Oak Ridge (disambiguation)